George Michael Bartenieff (January 24, 1933 – July 30, 2022) was a German-born American stage and film actor. He was noted both for his character roles in commercial and non-commercial films and on television, and for his work in the avant-garde theatre and performance world of downtown Manhattan, New York City in the 1960s and 1970s.  He was a co-founder of the Theatre for the New City, and of the Greenwich Village Halloween Parade.

Bartenieff appeared in nine shows on Broadway, in 19 productions Off-Broadway, in 18 films, and in 21 television episodes for 14 different programs. He was the recipient of two Obie Awards and a Drama Desk Award.

As of 2003, Bartenieff was also teaching at the City University of New York, and in a high school in the Bedford-Stuyvesant neighborhood of Brooklyn.

Life and career
Bartenieff was born in Berlin, Germany, the son of dancer parents, Irmgard (Prim) and Michael Bartenieff. As his father was Jewish, his parents left for the U.S. with the rise of the Nazis, settling in Pittsfield, Massachusetts. Bartenieff and his brother Igor lived with his mother's relatives in the Bavarian mountains, before joining their parents in the U.S. He made his stage debut at the age of 14 in the 1947 Broadway theatre production The Whole World Over, directed by Harold Clurman.  After appearing in a few shows on Broadway, Bartenieff went to London for training at the Royal Academy of Dramatic Arts, where he "fell in love" with the works of Shakespeare.  His intention at the time was to be a classical actor, and his hero was Laurence Olivier.

When Bartenieff returned to the United States, he worked with Andre Gregory's Theatre for the Living Arts in Philadelphia.  For a number of years in the 1960s, Bartenieff worked with Gregory in Philadelphia, on Broadway, for Joe Papp's New York Shakespeare Festival, and in "cross-disciplinary"  showcases at the Judson Poets Theatre at the Judson Church in Greenwich Village.

Bartenieff also began to do "street theatre" at this time.  One production, with writer/carpenter/landscape artist Bib Nichols, protested against the Lower Manhattan Expressway which Robert Moses wanted to build across the island.  Their production played in the street in the neighborhoods which would be affected by the highway, Little Italy and the West Village; the set was constructed in such a way that if a car came by, it would break apart to allow the vehicle to proceed.

In 1970, feeling that the Judson Poets Theatre had passed its peak, four artists involved in it – Bartenieff, his wife at the time, dancer Crystal Field, director Larry Kornfield, and Theo Barnes – wanted to start their own "cross-disciplinary theater which emphasized poetic language", according to Bartenieff.  The Westbeth Artists Community had just started at the time, and a large space appropriate for performance became available in the complex.  This was the beginning of Theatre for the New City, which still exists, albeit in other quarters. TNC not only did their own work, they invited other companies, such as Mabou Mines, the Talking Band, and Richard Foreman's company, to perform there.  They also mounted street theatre productions, with the purpose of making "the theater part of the community, and the community part of the theater."

Bartenieff stayed with Theatre for the New City for 24 years – performing, directing or producing more than 900 new American plays – but left when he began to feel he was spending more time on the financial problems of the company than he was on his craft. "I had to return," said Bartenieff, "to my own work, from being the Cecil B. DeMille of off-off-Broadway to the idea that small is more."  To this end, he collaborated with his wife, playwright and director Karen Malpede, to create a one-man show, I Will Bear Witness, an adaptation of the memoirs of Victor Klemperer, which documented daily life as a Jewish professor in Nazi Germany.  This production was the beginning of Bartenieff and Malpede's Theater Three Collaborative, which as of 2012 was 17 years old.

Bartenieff died in New York City on July 30, 2022, at the age of 89.

Stage productions

Broadway
The Whole World Over (1947, Biltmore Theatre, 0 previews, 100 performances) – featuring Uta Hagen and Sanford Meisner, directed by Harold Clurman
Montserrat (1949, Fulton Theatre, 0 prev. 65 perfs.) – by Lillian Hellman
The Moon Besieged (1962, Lyceum Theatre, 2 prev., 1 perf.) 
The Changeling (1964, understudy, ANTA Washington Square Theatre, 0 prev., 32 perfs.) – directed by Elia Kazan
Venus Is (1966, Billy Rose Theatre, 7 prev., 0 perfs.)
"Box" / "Quotations From Chairman Mao Tse-Tung" (1968, Billy Rose Theatre, 4 prev., 12 perf., in rep with production below) – two one-act plays by Edward Albee
"The Death of Bessie Smith" / "The American Dream" (1968, Billy Rose Theatre, 0 prev., 12 perf.) – two one-act plays by Edward Albee
Cop-Out (1969, Cort Theatre, 12 prev., 8 perfs.) – by John Guare
Unlikely Heroes: "Defender of the Faith" / "Epstein" / "Eli, the Fanatic" (1971, Plymouth Theatre, 9 prev., 23 perfs.) – three one-act plays based on stories by Philip Roth

Source:

Off-Broadway
The Brig – The Living Theatre (1963)
"Home Movies" / "Softly Consider the Nearness" – Provincetown Playhouse (1964) – two one-act plays by Rosalyn Drexler and Al Carmines
"Krapp's Last Tape" / "The Zoo Story" – Cherry Lane Theatre (1965) – by Samuel Beckett ("Krapp") and Edward Albee ("Zoo"), directed by Alan Schneider
"Walking to Waldheim" / "Happiness" – Mitzi E. Newhouse Theater at Lincoln Center (1967) – two one-act plays by Mayo Simon
The Memorandum – Joseph Papp Public Theater – Anspacher Theater (1968) – by Vaclav Havel
The Increased Difficulty of Concentration – Mitzi E. Newhouse Theater at Lincoln Center (1969) – by Václav Havel
Room Service – Edison Theatre (1970)
Trelawny of the "Wells" – Joseph Papp Public Theater – Anspacher Theater (1970–71) – by Arthur Wing Pinero
Dead End Kids – Joseph Papp Public Theater – Susan Stein Shiva Theater (1980–81) – by JoAnne Akalaitis, a Mabou Mines production
American Notes – Joseph Papp Public Theater – Susan Stein Shiva Theater (1988) – directed by JoAnne Akalaitis
Cymbeline – Joseph Papp Public Theater – Newman Theater (1989) – by William Shakespeare, directed by JoAnne Akalaitis, music by Philip Glass
Sabina – Primary Stages (1996) – by Willy Holtzman
Misalliance – Roundabout Theatre Company – Laura Pels Theatre (1997) – by George Bernard Shaw
World of Mirth – Theatre Four (2001)
Stuff Happens 	– Joseph Papp Public Theater – Newman Theater (2006) – by David Hare
Prometheus Bound – East 13th Street/CSC Theatre (2007) 	
Romeo and Juliet – Delacorte Theater at Lincoln Center (2007) – by William Shakespeare, directed by Michael Greif
Edward Albee's The American Dream and The Sandbox – Cherry Lane Theatre (2008) – two one-act plays by Edward Albee
The Bacchae – Delacorte Theater at Lincoln Center (2009) – by Euripides, music by Philip Glass		

Source:

Filmography

Film

Television

Awards and honors
In 1977, Theatre for the New City, of which Bartenieff was then co-director, won a Special Citation Obie Award for Sustained Excellence. Personally, Bartenieff won a 2001 Obie for his performance in his one-act play, I Will Bear Witness and a 2006 Drama Desk Award for his performance in Stuff Happens.

References
Notes

External links

George Bartenieff on the Internet Off-Broadway Database

1933 births
2022 deaths
American male film actors
American male stage actors
American male television actors
Drama Desk Award winners
Obie Award recipients
American theatre managers and producers
Alumni of RADA
Street theatre
German emigrants to the United States
Male actors from Berlin